Bahçekoyağı is a village in Bozyazı district of Mersin Province, Turkey. It is situated to the northeast  of Bozyazı. . The population of the village was 163. as of 2012.

References

Villages in Bozyazı District